Ursa Minor is the third studio album by American indie folk group Nana Grizol. It was released by Orange Twin on March 31, 2017.

Track listing

Personnel 
Nana Grizol
 Theodore Hilton
 Laura Carter
 Matte Cathcart
 Robbie Cucchiaro
 Jared Gandy

Production
 Jason NeSmith – mastering
 Andy LeMaster – co-producer, recorded by

Artwork
 Kev Connell – bear
 Christy Gressman – handwriting
 Robbie Cucchiaro – moon anchor, handwriting
 Patrick Sprague – paintings

References

2017 albums
Nana Grizol albums